"Blinded by the Light" is a song written and recorded by Bruce Springsteen, which first appeared on his 1973 debut album Greetings from Asbury Park, N.J. A cover by British rock band Manfred Mann's Earth Band reached number one on the Billboard Hot 100 in the United States in February 1977 and was also a top ten hit in the United Kingdom, New Zealand, and Canada.

History
The song came about when Columbia Records president Clive Davis, upon listening to an early version of Greetings from Asbury Park N.J., felt the album lacked a potential single. Springsteen wrote this and "Spirit in the Night" in response.

According to Springsteen, he wrote the song by going through a rhyming dictionary in search of appropriate words. The first line of the song, "Madman drummers, bummers, and Indians in the summers with a teenage diplomat" is autobiographical—"Madman drummers" is a reference to drummer Vini Lopez, known as "Mad Man" (later changed to "Mad Dog"); "Indians in the summer" refers to the name of Springsteen's old Little League team; "teenage diplomat" refers to himself. "As the adolescent pumps his way into his hat" recalls his aunt Dora Kirby claiming "Bruce never took his baseball hat off." A "merry-go-round" is baseball slang for when a pitcher keeps walking batters. The remainder of the song tells of many unrelated events, with the refrain of "Blinded by the light, cut loose like a deuce, another runner in the night".

"Blinded by the Light" was the first single from Greetings from Asbury Park, N.J.'Cash Box said that it was "much like early Dylan, but especially like 'My Back Pages,'" and that Springsteen "lets loose with a lyrical barrage of images and pictures."

Manfred Mann's Earth Band version

Manfred Mann's Earth Band released a version of the song on their 1976 album The Roaring Silence. Their version includes the "Chopsticks" melody played on piano near the end of the bridge of the song. The track reached No. 1 on both the Billboard Hot 100 and the Canadian RPM charts. Manfred Mann's Earth Band's recording of "Blinded by the Light" is Springsteen's only No. 1 single as a songwriter on the Hot 100; his highest charting single as a solo performer was "Dancing in the Dark" in 1984, which reached No. 2 on the Hot 100, and his only No. 1 was as part of the USA for Africa ensemble that recorded "We Are the World". Mann, who appeared on the Sonny and Cher show shortly after the success of the song, claimed: "Me and the band didn't really see the song ending. We wanted to keep rocking, so we did. Interestingly enough though, we painted ourselves into a proverbial corner. It was at that point I realized I didn't know how to end the song." Record World'' said that "After a synthesized intro reminiscent of 'Won't Get Fooled Again,' the group is in full throttle."

Lyrics

Manfred Mann's Earth Band's recording of the song changes the lyrics. The most prominent change is in the chorus, where Springsteen's "cut loose like a deuce" is replaced with either "revved up like a deuce" or "wrapped up like a deuce". The lyric is a reference to the 1932 V8-powered Ford automobile, which enthusiasts dubbed the "deuce coupe" (the "deuce" coming from the 2 in 1932, the first year the V8 was available). Springsteen was fond of classic hot rods in his youth, hence the line "cut loose like a deuce, another runner in the night". As the line is frequently misheard as "wrapped up like a douche", Springsteen has joked about confusion over the lyrics, claiming that it was not until Manfred Mann rewrote the song to be about a feminine hygiene product that it became popular.

According to Manfred Mann, it was the idea of drummer Chris Slade to use the chords of "Chopsticks" (the tune had at that point already been integrated into the arrangement) as a transition between song parts. The "deuce"/"douche" confusion stems from technical problems (which can be confirmed by comparing to live recordings).

Chart performance

Weekly charts

Year-end charts

Personnel
According to authors Philippe Margotin and Jean-Michel Guesdon:

Original version
 Bruce Springsteen – vocals, acoustic and electric guitar, bass
 Vini "Mad Dog" Lopez – drums
 Clarence Clemons – saxophone, backing vocals
 Harold Wheeler – piano
 Unknown musicians – organ, tambourine

Manfred Mann's Earth Band cover
Manfred Mann – organ, piano, Minimoog, backing vocals, lead vocals
Chris Hamlet Thompson – lead vocals, rhythm guitar
Dave Flett – lead guitar
Colin Pattenden – bass
Chris Slade – drums, backing vocals
with
Doreen Chanter – backing vocals
Irene Chanter – backing vocals
Susanne Lynch – backing vocals

See also
Blinded by the Light (2019 film) – a 2019 British comedy-drama about an aspiring writer inspired by Bruce Springsteen songs.

References

1973 debut singles
1976 singles
1977 singles
Billboard Hot 100 number-one singles
Cashbox number-one singles
RPM Top Singles number-one singles
Bruce Springsteen songs
Manfred Mann songs
Mondegreens
Songs written by Bruce Springsteen
Columbia Records singles
Song recordings produced by Mike Appel
1972 songs
Bronze Records singles
Warner Records singles